Yiddish Glory: The Lost Songs of World War II  is a 61st Annual Grammy Awards nominated album by Six Degrees Records which consists of Yiddish songs written during World War II and the Holocaust.

History
The team of a Russian Jewish ethnomusicologist and Yiddish scholar Moisei Beregovsky collected hundreds of Jewish songs during 1930–1940s, and planned to publish an anthology. However, during the post-war outbreak of Soviet anti-Semitism Beregovsky was convicted of "Jewish nationalism" and sent to Gulag. Fortunately, his confiscated archives were returned to his wife.

The collection of wax cylinder recordings, of which 600 were made by Beregovsky, was looted by the Nazis, but returned after the war. However, when the Cabinet of Jewish Culture of the Ukrainian Academy of Sciences was liquidated, the recordings disappeared and were believed to be destroyed. In 1990s Beregovsky's wax cylinders were discovered and catalogued by the Vernadsky National Library of Ukraine. Since 1980s and later, with new findings, his collections were published and republished, and many tunes entered the repertoire of Klezmer musicians.

Anna Shternshis, Al and Malka Green Professor in Yiddish Studies and the Director of the Anne Tanenbaum Centre for Jewish Studies at the University of Toronto worked with Beregovsky's paper archives, and Yiddish Glory is the result of a multi-year project of Shternshis and Pavel Lion, better known as Psoy Korolenko. Most of the selected Holocaust-related songs had only lyrics, and musical solutions for them were suggested by Sergei Erdenko.

Track listing
From the Six Degrees Records website:
Afn Hoykhn Barg – On The High Mountain
A satirical song, lyrics by a Veli Shargorodskii about the war experience of a Jewish soldier in 1943–44; ends with the words "Hitler is kaput!" (Hitler is busted!, a phrase learned by heart by every Soviet person by the end of the war, because that's what surrendering Germans repeated like a mantra.)
Shpatsir in Vald – A Walk in the Forest
Yoshke Fun Odes – Yoshke From Odessa
Kazakhstan
Central Asia was a major destination of Soviet civilians, including 1.4 million Jews (with some 250,000 in Kazakhstan), where at their new workplaces they met the Jews sent to Gulag. The song is about this piece of the Jewish eternal exile experience. For this song Erdenko composed the only new tune, combining Roma, Yiddish and Romanian musical styles.
Mayn Pulemyot – My Machine Gun
A Jewish soldier's pride at his machine gun killing the Germans
Shelakhmones Hitlern – Purim Gifts For Hitler
compares Hitler with Haman, the villain of Purim
Taybls Briv – Taybl's Letter To Her Husband at the Front
Misha Tserayst Hitlers Daytchland – Misha Tears Apart Hitler's Germany
Chuvasher Tekhter – Daughters of Chuvashia, words by Sonya Roznberg, 1942.
Mames Gruv – My Mother's Grave
The song a child who visits the grave of the mother who perished in the Holocaust. 
Babi Yar
About the Babi Yar massacre. The song is that of a Jewish soldier (one of half a million who served in the Soviet Army) who returns to Kiev and learns that all his family was massacred.
Tulchin
 Tulchyn was under the Romanian administration during the Holocaust. The song was written by a 10-year-old who lost his family in the ghetto in Tulchin
 Shturemvind – A Storm Wind
Fir Zin – Four Sons
Kazakhstan Reprise
Nitsokhn Lid – Victory Song
Homens Mapole – Haman's Defeat
Tsum Nayem Yor 1944 – Happy New Year 1944

Band
According to the Six Degrees Records webpage:
Psoy Korolenko, Russian-American singer-songwriter
Sergei Erdenko, Romani violinist, collaborator of Yehudi Menuhin and founder of the group Loyko.
Artur Gorbenko, violinist, pianist, composer for films and television programs, and former concertmaster from the Leningrad Conservatory.
Mikhail Savichev, classical and Romani guitarist, graduate of Russia's Novosibirsk Conservatory, before moving to Spain to study under the mentorship of Paco de Lucia.
Sophie Milman, Juno Award winning jazz vocalist
Alexander Sevastian, accordionist from Quartetto Gelato
Shalom Bard, clarinetist at the Toronto Symphony Orchestra, conductor of its youth symphony, and former principal clarinetist at the Israel Philharmonic Orchestra
David Buchbinder, Juno Award-winning trumpeter, composer & producer, founder of Odessa/Havana and artistic director of the New Canadian Global Music Orchestra
Sasha Lurje, Yiddish vocalist
Isaac Rosenberg, 12 years old when the project started; performs music written by a Jewish orphan whose parents perished during the Holocaust.
Anna Shternshis, Al and Malka Green Professor in Yiddish Studies and the Director of the Anne Tanenbaum Centre for Jewish Studies at the University of Toronto

Production
The producer is Daniel Rosenberg.

References

Yiddish-language albums
Anti-fascist music
2018 albums
Songs about the Holocaust
Songs of World War II
Six Degrees Records artists